Maulana Nurunnabi Samdani is an Islamic Democratic League politician and the former Member of Parliament of Jessore-2.

Career
Samdani was elected to parliament from Jessore-2 as an Islamic Democratic League candidate in 1979.

References

Islamic Democratic League politicians
Living people
2nd Jatiya Sangsad members
Year of birth missing (living people)